Mark Helm (born 21 October 2001) is an English professional footballer who plays as a midfielder for Burton Albion.

Club career

Early career
Born in Warrington, Helm joined Manchester United at the age of seven, before leaving the club in 2021 at the expiration of his contract. Immediately after leaving Manchester United, he signed for Burnley, citing Dwight McNeil, who had also made the move from United to Burnley, as a role model for paving the route to first-team football. His career at Burnley got off to a good start, with the midfielder earning praise for his performances in pre-season friendlies.

Burton Albion
On 12 January 2023, Helm moved to EFL League One side Burton Albion on an eighteen-month deal. He made his debut two days later, in a 4–0 home loss to Shrewsbury Town, with his first performance being described as 'tidy'.

Style of play
A versatile midfielder, capable of playing in the centre of the field as a playmaker or box-to-box midfielder, as well as the right-hand side, Helm drew comparisons to former Manchester United player Wayne Rooney. He is also a dead ball specialist, and is known for dictating the tempo of play.

Career statistics

Club

Notes

References

2001 births
Living people
Footballers from Warrington
English footballers
Association football midfielders
English Football League players
Manchester United F.C. players
Burnley F.C. players
Burton Albion F.C. players